t Haantje may refer to:

 't Haantje, Drenthe, a small village in of Coevorden, Drenthe, Netherlands
 't Haantje, North Brabant, a hamlet in the municipality of Steenbergen, North Brabant, Netherlands
 't Haantje, Overijssel, a hamlet in the municipality of Hardenberg, Overijssel, Netherlands